Weir Here – The Best of Bob Weir is a 2004 live/studio compilation album featuring former Grateful Dead rhythm guitarist and co-vocalist Bob Weir. A career retrospective, it features tracks from many of Weir's bands, solo and duo projects, as well as those from his main gig with the Dead.

Content
Similarly to Birth of the Dead, The album contains two discs – one studio and one live. The studio 
disc proceeds chronologically, beginning with Weir's first solo effort then including his work in the bands 
Kingfish, RatDog, Weir & Wasserman (though the duo is here a 
trio, augmented by Neil Young), Bobby & the Midnites, and one track by the 
Grateful Dead. The final track of the disc is from a then-recent appearance on a children's album by Dan Zanes (of Del Fuegos fame).

The live disc features a variety of songs from Grateful Dead performances with Weir as the lead singer – though five of the tracks were previously unreleased – and one track by RatDog (a Dylan cover from a 2003 band rehearsal).

Production and critical reception
The album was compiled by Hybrid Recordings, with final approval by Weir. It is currently out of print. The cover art is by Alton Kelley with liner notes by Grateful Dead publicist Dennis McNally. The title refers to the focus being on Weir, "speaking up" as the Dead's "secondary" guitarist, and is a pun on "we're here", a reference to the existential element of attending a live Grateful Dead concert (and in general).

In the album's press release, Andrew Clarke of The Independent called Bob Weir "arguably rock's greatest, if most eccentric, rhythm guitarist." Joel Selvin of the San Francisco Chronicle said, "No major rock star's solo career has ever received less attention than Weir's." He said the album "[shines] some light on Weir's long-term (albeit secondary) solo career", and that "he can let other musicians pick out the material he sings. He doesn't care about that. He is the rarest of musical animals – a hands-off bandleader. It hasn't exactly been a bell-ringing, million-selling solo career, but underachiever Weir has never gotten his due for some genuine high points and a whole lot of good music under his own brand."

Track listing

Disc one - studio

Disc two - live

All tracks performed by the Grateful Dead, except track 11 performed by RatDog.

References

Bob Weir albums
2004 greatest hits albums
Hybrid Recordings albums